Pielgrzymowice may refer to the following places:
Pielgrzymowice, Lesser Poland Voivodeship (south Poland)
Pielgrzymowice, Opole Voivodeship (south-west Poland)
Pielgrzymowice, Silesian Voivodeship (south Poland)